Foreign relations exist between Armenia and the United Kingdom. The United Kingdom recognised Armenia on 31 December 1991. The first Embassy of Armenia in Europe was established in London in October 1992; in 1995 the United Kingdom established an embassy in Yerevan. The two countries maintain collaborative and friendly relations.

History

1890s
In the late 19th century, Armenia was divided between Russia and Turkey. Tensions began to escalate in Turkey in the 1880s and especially the 1890s, leading to a series of international crises that the British tried to help resolve by putting pressure on the Turkish government.  Britain had long been a major friend of the Turkish government, helping it resist heavy expansionist pressure from Russia. In the 1880s, London pushed for reforms, with a special focus on better treatment of Christians across the Ottoman Empire.  The Ottoman government resisted the pressures, and distanced itself from Britain. Instead, Constantinople turned increasingly to Germany for political, financial and commercial support, leading eventually to its entrance into the First World War as a German ally. 

As atrocities mounted against Armenians in Turkey British public opinion was outraged.  London tried to coordinate a response from Britain, Russia, Germany, Austria and France. They were unable to agree on suitable sanctions or punishment; historians believe Turkey would have made concessions if threatened with an actual war. Germany wanted to help Turkey; Russia did not want to stir up its own large Armenian community. France wanted to restrict the British role in the region. William Gladstone, a leading Liberal then in retirement, called on Britain to intervene alone.  The Liberal Prime Minister Lord Rosebery refused. The crisis weakened Roseberry, who resigned in June 1895.  The crisis reached a violent peak in 1896, after bombings in Constantinople led to  massive attacks on Armenians living in the city, with thousands murdered. Lord Salisbury, the new Conservative Prime Minister tried and failed to get the Powers to intervene. Nothing was done to help the Armenians.

First World War
British policy around 1910 stood in opposition to Russian control of Armenia, and tried to push the Ottoman Empire into improving its treatment of Armenians. 
When the World War erupted, Britain rejected the idea of forming an Armenian Legion to fight against the Turks. Instead it supported an Armenian Legion under French command that did fight in Cyprus. 

As news of the Massacres of Armenians emerged, London worked to demonstrate that its imperial responsibilities included the enforcement of human rights. The Turks responded with a heightened anti-British nationalism.

State visits between Armenia and the United Kingdom
There are various state visits between Armenia and the United Kingdom the latest being the visit of the British State Minister of Europe David Lidington to Yerevan. Additionally President of Armenia Serzh Sargsyan visited the United Kingdom in July 2012.

Prime Minister Margaret Thatcher visited Armenia in June 1990 when it was part of the Soviet Union.

Armenian genocide recognition

The devolved governments of Wales and Scotland recognize the Armenian genocide, however the British government does not recognize the Armenian genocide, as it considers that the evidence is not clear enough to respectively consider "the terrible events that afflicted the Ottoman Armenian population at the beginning of the last century" genocide under the 1948 UN convention. The British government states the "massacres were an appalling tragedy" and condemns them stating that this was the view of the government during that period.

Armenian community of the UK
According to Vered Amit's Armenians in London: The Management of Social Boundaries, published in 1989, around 10,000 Armenians were living in Greater London at the time. The majority were thought to be first-generation immigrants from Lebanon, Syria, Iraq, Iran and Cyprus. They also include Armenians from Ethiopia, India, Egypt, Israel, as well as individuals from other countries.

Manchester has been home to an Armenian population since 1835, with 30 Armenian businesses thought to have been operating in the city by 1862.

Resident diplomatic missions
 Armenia has an embassy in London.
 United Kingdom has an embassy in Yerevan.

See also 
 Armenians in the United Kingdom
 British in Armenia

References

Further reading
 Douglas, Roy. "Britain and the Armenian Question, 1894–7." Historical Journal 19#1 (1976): 113-133.
 Langer, William L. The Diplomacy of Imperialism: 1890–1902 (2nd ed. 1950), a standard diplomatic history of Europe; see pp 145-67, 202-9, 324-29
 Salt, Jeremy. "Britain, the Armenian question and the cause of Ottoman reform: 1894–96." Middle Eastern Studies 26.3 (1990): 308-328.

External links

  Armenian embassy in London
 armeniangenocide - epetition response 6 December 2007.
  British Foreign and Commonwealth Office about relations with Armenia
 British embassy in Yerevan

 
Bilateral relations of the United Kingdom
United Kingdom